The 2012 Pan American Individual Event Artistic Gymnastics Championships was held in Medellín, Colombia, June 19–25, 2012. The competition was organized by the Colombian Gymnastics Federation and approved by the International Gymnastics Federation.

Medal summary

Senior medalists

Junior medalists

Medal table

Seniors

Juniors

References

2012 in gymnastics
Pan American Gymnastics Championships
International gymnastics competitions hosted by Colombia
2012 in Colombian sport